Dowdeman or Dudman or Doodman may refer to:
 Dowdeman, Darab
 Dudman, Shiraz